Vranjak is a Serbo-Croatian toponym, derived from vran, an archaic word for "dark, black". It may refer to:

Vranjak, Modriča, Bosnia and Herzegovina
Vranjak, Orahovac, Kosovo

See also
Vranje
Vranjska (disambiguation)